Stade Auto Lyon, commonly abbreviated as SA Lyon or SAL, is a French basketball club that is based in Lyon, now disappeared from the high and mid level of French professional leagues.

History 
The year 1916 marks the creation by the founder of Berliet automobiles, Marius Berliet, of  Union Sportive Berliet  for enterprise workers can practice sports. Several sections was open: basketball, rugby, football, etc.

During the Second World War the club goes out and, in 1944, founded the  Stade Berliet . The following year a new name finally adopted and it was  Stade Auto Lyon . The SAL was the first sports club in the Lyon region from 1949 to 1970. The basketball section for nine seasons, belonged to the elite championship of France for a record of 82 wins, 4 draws and 72 defeats in 158 matches.

The club won the French Cup in 1960–61 against the PUC and finished second in the championship in 1959–60, 1960–61 and 1967–68 seasons.

The 1968–69 season, SAL took part for first and only time in the European Cup Winners Cup where they were eliminated in the second round by the Bulgarian Levski-Spartak (crashing defeat in Sofia with 53–85 and victory in Lyon with a score of 75–63).

Honours 
Total titles: (2)

French Cup
 Winners (1): 1960–61
French League 2
 Winners (1): 1956–57

Notable players 
  Jacques Cachemire
  Bernard Fatien
  Pierre Galle
  Bernard Lamarque
  Gérard Lespinasse
  Robert Monclar
  Christian Petit
  Albert Demeyer
  Michel Housse

Head coaches 
  André Buffière

Basketball teams in France
Sport in Lyon
1948 establishments in France
Basketball teams established in 1948